

Ernst Sieler (22 August 1893 – 6 October 1983) was a general in the Wehrmacht of Nazi Germany during World War II who commanded the LIX. Corps. He was a recipient of the Knight's Cross of the Iron Cross with Oak Leaves. Sieler surrendered to the Soviet forces in the course of Red Army's Vistula–Oder Offensive.  He was held in the Soviet Union as a war criminal until 1955.

Awards and decorations
 Iron Cross (1914) 2nd Class (14 September 1914) & 1st Class (1 July 1916)
 Clasp to the Iron Cross (1939) 2nd Class (11 May 1940) & 1st Class (23 May 1940)
 German Cross in Gold on 23 February 1944 as Generalleutnant and commander of 304. Infanterie-Division
 Knight's Cross of the Iron Cross with Oak Leaves
 Knight's Cross on 12 September 1941 as Oberst and commander of Infanterie-Regiment 46
 502nd Oak Leaves on 24 June 1944 as Generalleutnant and commander of 304. Infanterie-Division

References

Citations

Bibliography

 
 
 

1893 births
1983 deaths
Lieutenant generals of the German Army (Wehrmacht)
German Army personnel of World War I
Recipients of the clasp to the Iron Cross, 1st class
Recipients of the Gold German Cross
Recipients of the Knight's Cross of the Iron Cross with Oak Leaves
German prisoners of war in World War II held by the Soviet Union
People from Altenburg
People from Saxe-Altenburg
Prussian Army personnel
Reichswehr personnel
Military personnel from Thuringia
German Army generals of World War II